The Islamic Society of Orange County, incorporated on January 5, 1976, is one of the largest Muslim centers in the Western Hemisphere, with almost 7,000 worshipers. It is neighbored by the Islamic Center of Irvine. Its director, Dr. Muzammil Siddiqi, is a scholar of Comparative Religion who received his Ph.D. from Harvard University. ISOC is one of the first Muslim centers to be established in Southern California.

See also
  List of mosques in the Americas
  Lists of mosques 
  List of mosques in the United States

References

External links 

Mosques in California
Buildings and structures in Garden Grove, California
Religious buildings and structures in Orange County, California
Islamic organizations established in 1976
Culture of Garden Grove, California
1976 establishments in California
Mosques completed in 1976